The Bundesstraße 299 or B 299 is a major route in the Oberpfalz (Upper Palatinate) region of Bavaria. It runs through Neumarkt in der Oberpfalz, Amberg and Grafenwoehr.

299
Roads in Bavaria